This is a list of venues used for professional baseball in Montreal, Quebec. The information is a compilation of the information contained in the references listed.

French names are included in parentheses next to the English names.

Atwater Park (Parc Atwater)
Home of:
Montreal - (two different short-lived clubs) International League (1890 part-season)
?Montreal - Eastern International League (1895 only)
Montreal Jingos/Royals - International League 1897-1917
Montreal Royals - Eastern Canada League (1922-1923)
Montreal Royals - Quebec/Ontario/Vermont League (1924-27)
Location: 1500 Atwater Avenue; Montreal, QC, H3Z 1X5 (northeast, third base); Saint-Catherine Street West (southeast, left field); arena and Wood Avenue (southwest, right field); De Maisonneuve Boulevard (originally Western Avenue) (northwest, first base) 
Currently: Place Alexis Nihon, shopping center and office buildings

Delorimier Stadium / Hector Racine Stadium  (Stade Delormier / Stade Hector-Racine)
Home of: Montreal Royals - International League (1928-1960)
Location: 2101 Ontario Street East (east, first base); Parthenais Street (north, right field); Lariviere Street (west, left field); De Lorimier Avenue (south, third base)

Jarry Park (Parc Jarry)
Home of: Montreal Expos - National League (1969-1976)
Location: Faillon (later Gary Carter) (east, first base); St. Laurent (north, far beyond right field); Jarry (west, far beyond left field); railroad (south, third base);
Currently: Refitted as a tennis facility, now called IGA Stadium (Stade IGA)

Olympic Stadium (Stade Olympique)
Home of: Montreal Expos - National League (1977-2004)
Location: 4545 Pierre de Coubertin Avenue (first base); Sherbrooke (left field); Pie IX (third base); Viau (right field)

See also

Lists of baseball parks
Hiram Bithorn Stadium

Sources
Peter Filichia, Professional Baseball Franchises, Facts on File, 1993.
Phil Lowry, Green Cathedrals,  several editions.
Michael Benson, Ballparks of North America, McFarland, 1989.

External links

 
Montreal
Sports venues in Montreal
Baseball